An American Indian Museum is a museum that focuses on the history, culture and arts of North American native peoples. Specifically, it may refer to:

 National Museum of the American Indian, Washington D.C.
 George Gustav Heye Center, or the National Museum of the American Indian–New York, New York City
 Iroquois Indian Museum in Howes Cave, New York
 Mitchell Museum of the American Indian in Evanston, Illinois
 Southwest Museum of the American Indian, in Los Angeles, California
 Wheelwright Museum of the American Indian in Santa Fe, New Mexico

See also
Museum of Native American History, in Bentonville, Arkansas
:Category:Native American museums in the United States